Shyamal Sen Smriti samman (Shyamal Sen Memorial award) is an award given for outstanding work in Bengali art, theater and film.  The award is named after ex-Governor of West Bengal (199), Justice Shyamal Kumar Sen. Noted awardees include  sculptor Sudip Bakshi (1999), playwright Bratya Basu (2000), and film-maker Atanu Ghosh (2008).

West Bengal awards